= Espérance-François Bulayumi =

Congolese writer (born 1959)

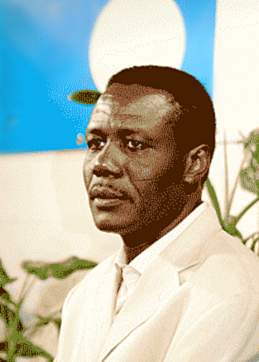
Bulayumi

Espérance-François Ngayibata Bulayumi (Kinshasa, 12 November 1959) is a Congolese writer.

== Life ==
He studied arts in Kinshasa and philosophy at the University of Vienna (1983-1988), where he received his doctorate and worked later as a professor. He also studied theology in Lausanne. His most emblematic work is Mosuni, which deals with Congolese identity and its link-up with European culture; it includes novel, poetry and popular tales.

== Works ==
- Das Beichten eines Afro-Wieners 2012
- Ebembe ya Thomson, 2011
- Dealer wider Willen? Wege afrikanischer Migrantinnen und Migranten nach / in Österreich, 2009
- Mosuni, 2006
- LISAPO: Ein Tor zu afrikanischen Märchen, 2002
- Sterbebegleitung als Lebensbegleitung: Eine imperative ethische Notwendigkeit, 2001
- Congo 2000 : Fin du temps ou nouvelle naissance?, 2000
- Esakoli.Großvater erzählt: Geschichten und Fabeln aus dem Kongo, 1999
